Sergeant William McNally VC, MM and Bar (16 December 1894 – 5 January 1976) was a British Army soldier and an English recipient of the Victoria Cross (VC), the highest and most prestigious award for gallantry in the face of the enemy that can be awarded to British and Commonwealth forces.

Details
He was 23 years old, and a sergeant in the 8th (S) Battalion, The Yorkshire Regiment (Alexandra, Princess of Wales's Own), British Army during the First World War when the following deed took place for which he was awarded the VC.

On 27 October 1918 at Piave River, Italy, when his company was most seriously hindered by machine-gun fire, Sergeant McNally, regardless of personal safety, rushed the machine-gun post single-handed, killing the team and capturing the gun. Later, at Vazzola on 29 October the sergeant crept up to the rear of an enemy post, put the garrison to flight and captured the machine-gun. On the same day, when holding a newly captured ditch, he was strongly counter-attacked from both flanks, but coolly controlling the fire of his party, he frustrated that attack, inflicting heavy casualties on the enemy.

His VC is displayed at the Green Howards Museum, Richmond, North Yorkshire, alongside the medals of a fellow resident of Murton, James Hall DCM MM.

References

External links
Location of grave and VC medal (Co. Durham)

1894 births
1976 deaths
Burials in Tyne and Wear
Green Howards soldiers
British World War I recipients of the Victoria Cross
Italian front (World War I)
People from Murton, County Durham
Recipients of the Military Medal
British Army recipients of the Victoria Cross
Military personnel from County Durham